is a Japanese media franchise that began with a 1991 manga by Kei Sadayasu published in Kodansha's Weekly Morning. An anime television series was broadcast in 1992. The series was later adapted to a video game developed and published by Sega for the Game Gear and Mega Drive. A port was also released on the Game Boy, released by ASK.

Premise
On the first day of the September Professional Sumo Tournament, the new yokozuna Harimanada enters the ring wearing an eerie mask, surprising the audience. He then declares that he will break Futabayama's streak of 69 consecutive wins, and that he would retire on the spot if he loses even once. This invokes the wrath of the Japan Sumo Association and makes an enemy of all makuuchi wrestlers.

Characters
Isao Harimanada (播磨灘勲 (はりまなだ いさお)) / Isao Yamagata (山形勲 (やまがた いさお)
Voiced by Akio Ōtsuka
The protagonist. Stands at 6'0" and weighs 335 pounds.

Raikō (雷光 (らいこう)
Voiced by Kenichi Ogata
Harimanada's master.

Atagoyama (愛宕山 (あたごやま)
Voiced by Yuzuru Fujimoto
The Chairman of the Sumo Association. He is modeled after Wakanohana, the then-incumbent head of the real-life Sumo Association.

Yasokichi Fugaku (富嶽八十吉 (ふがく やそきち) / Iote Iyaokea
Voiced by Masahiro Anzai
A mountainous 550-pound Hawaiian ozeki. He is modeled after Konishiki.

Media
E&G Film produced an anime television series based on the manga, titled . It was directed by Norio Osada. The series premiered in Japan on TV Tokyo on April 23, 1992, and ran for 23 episodes until its conclusion on October 1, 1992. Aah! Harimanada is notable as an animated series based on the rare theme of sumo wrestling; following the end of the series' broadcast, no other such series would be produced until the premiere of Rowdy Wrestler!! Matsutaro in 2014.

Aah! Harimanada was adapted into three video games of the same name in 1993. A Game Gear title was developed by Sega and released on July 2. A Game Boy title by Ask Kodansha was released on July 23. Sega also developed a title for the Mega Drive that was released on September 3. The Mega Drive game was criticized for its "poor responsiveness" and "boring gameplay". British gaming magazine Sega Pro rated the Mega Drive version 59 out of 100.

References

External links

Anime info page at AllCinema.net 

1991 manga
1992 anime television series debuts
1992 Japanese television series endings
1993 video games
Anime series based on manga
Game Boy games
Japan-exclusive video games
Kodansha manga
Manga adapted into television series
Game Gear games
Sega Genesis games
Seinen manga
Sports video games
Sumo mass media
TV Tokyo original programming
Video games based on anime and manga
Sumo anime and manga